Vítězslav Mooc (born 4 January 1978) is a Czech former footballer. He played for FC Hradec Králové in the Czech First League as well as in the second tier of Polish football. The striker was given a six-month deal by Thistle manager Ian McCall following a 3-week trial. He previously played for FC Slovaj Trebisov before joining Thistle. His playing career saw him play in Poland, the Czech Republic, Malaysia and then Scotland. He was released by Thistle in May 2008.

References

1978 births
Living people
Czech footballers
Czech First League players
Scottish Football League players
MFK Vítkovice players
FC Hradec Králové players
Negeri Sembilan FA players
Partick Thistle F.C. players
KSZO Ostrowiec Świętokrzyski players
Expatriate footballers in Poland
Czech expatriate sportspeople in Poland
Czech expatriate footballers
Association football forwards
RKS Radomsko players